Pilodeudorix angelita, the Angelita's playboy, is a butterfly in the family Lycaenidae. It is found in Nigeria, Cameroon, Gabon, the Republic of the Congo, the Central African Republic and the Democratic Republic of the Congo. The habitat consists of primary forests.

Subspecies
Pilodeudorix angelita angelita (Cameroon, Gabon, Congo, Central African Republic, western and eastern Democratic Republic of the Congo)
Pilodeudorix angelita schultzei (Aurivillius, 1907) (Nigeria: Cross River loop, Cameroon: west of the mountains)

References

External links
Die Gross-Schmetterlinge der Erde 13: Die Afrikanischen Tagfalter. Plate XIII 65 i, k nominate and schultzei (Aurivillius, 1907)

Butterflies described in 1904
Deudorigini